Jobst Wagner (born 20 February 1959 in Rehau) is a Swiss entrepreneur.

Life
After attending schools in Canada, Germany and Switzerland, he graduated in law (lic.jur.) from the University of Bern. Starting in 1986, he worked in different positions at Rehau Group, a company founded by his father Helmut Wagner in 1948 in Rehau, Germany. In 2000, Helmut Wagner transferred control of the company to his sons Jobst and Veit Wagner.

Jobst Wagner has three adult children.

Business
As president of the supervisory board of the Rehau group, he leads a worldwide group of companies with approximately 18,000 employees in more than 50 countries. The independent, privately held company operates around the globe as a system manufacturer for the construction, automotive and industry sector. The REHAU Group has also a subsidiary, which produces appliances for the medical industry.

Jobst Wagner is also one of the largest shareholders of the SMH Verlag AG and is member of the Supervisory Board. He is the founder and the Research Council within the Foundation StrategieDialog21. The StrategieDialog21 (SD21) sees itself as a dialogue platform with a focus on federally-liberal values and derived strategic approaches and impulses for Switzerland.

Art Patronage
At the company’s corporate headquarter in Rehau, Germany, Wagner is making art accessible to employees and the public with the Rehau Art gallery, which organizes various events and exhibitions. One such exhibition displays woodcarvings by the Swiss artist Franz Gertsch.

Wagner also supports a large number of cultural institutions in Switzerland. Amongst others, he is the president of the Kunsthalle Bern foundation, member of the foundation board for the Bern Kunstmuseum and GegenwART foundation, as well as advisory board member of the Bern University of the Arts. Together with the Hochfranken business initiative he also supports the International Film Festival Hof.

Honors and awards
In 1999, Wagner received an award for his activities with GegenwART of the ‘Handels- und Industrieverein’ Bern.

He is also an honorary citizen of La Chapelle-Saint-Ursin, France.

In 2018 Bavarian State Minister for Economic Affairs, Energy and Technology Franz Josef Pschierer awarded REHAU group president Jobst Wagner the State Medal for special services to the Bavarian economy.

Literature 
 Executive Profile [ Jobst Wagner, Bloomberg Businessweek]
 Macher und Mäzen. In: WirtschaftsBlatt. 9. November 2006, pp. 6. (online, in German).
 Schweizer Standards - Aus bester Familie: 100 vorbildliche Schweizer Familienunternehmen, . (in German and French)
 Vom Sammeln, with text contributions from Norberto Gramaccini, Michael Krethlow, Reto Sorg and Jobst Wagner, Publisher: Jobst Wagner, .

References

External links
 Website of Jobst Wagner (in German)
 Supervisory Board of the SMH Verlag AG (in German)

1959 births
German emigrants to Switzerland
Living people
Swiss businesspeople
People from Rehau